Mohi may refer to:

 Muhi or Mohi, a village in eastern Hungary
 Battle of Mohi, a 1241 battle between the Mongol Empire and the Kingdom of Hungary, named for the village it took place near
 Medal of Honor: Infiltrator, a 2003 game for the Game Boy Advance
 Mohi (TV series), an Indian soap opera
 Mattha, aka "Mohi", a spice beverage
 Mita Mohi (1938–2016), New Zealand Maori and rugby player
 Mohi (Ludhiana West), Punjab, India